Ab Tum Ja Saktey Ho is a Pakistani television film directed by Mehreen Jabbar. It is based on a short story by Khadija Mastoor. It starred Khalida Riyasat, Sania Saeed and Humayun Saeed. The television film was released in 1996 and first broadcast on Pakistan Television Corporation.

The telefilm is among the earliest works of the director, Jabbar.

Plot 

Aliya is an unmarried school teacher who lives with her niece Raheela. Aliya is used to interfering in every aspect of Raheela's life to which the young girl feels trapped. But she doesn't dare to raise her voice against her. Things change completely for both of them when a relative of Aliya, Shaukat comes there to live.

Cast

 Khalida Riyasat as Aliya
 Sania Saeed as Raheela
 Humayun Saeed as Shuakat

Reception 

A reviewer from Daily Times praised the telefilm for its theme of obsession of marriage, and said it as "another feel-good telefilm" by  Jabbar".

References 

Pakistan Television Corporation original programming
1996 television films
Urdu-language Pakistani films